The archaeological site of Ancient Pap (also known as Balandtepa) is located on the bank of the Syr Darya River in the Namangan Region of Uzbekistan.

Site description 
The ancient site includes the citadel, the main city and the rabad (or suburb).

World Heritage status 
This site was added to the UNESCO World Heritage Tentative List on January 18, 2008, in the cultural category.

References 

Geography of Uzbekistan
Archaeological sites in Uzbekistan